The Chameleon Club is a music venue located in the historic downtown Lancaster, Pennsylvania.

History
Founded by Rich Ruoff and Alexandra Brown in 1985, the Chameleon Club was originally located in the back room of a prominent fine dining restaurant called Tom Paine's (after the historical figure Thomas Paine). At its conception, the small approximately 100 person capacity room offered performances of live, original music in Lancaster City.

In 1988, three years after its opening, the club was relocated to the 200 block of Prince Street with an entrance on Water Street.

Circa 1995, the venue was signed on to do a live television show entitled "Live at the Chameleon Club" which aired on PRISM Network, a now defunct Philadelphia area cable network.

In 2002, following a questionable police raid, Rich Ruoff sold the Chameleon Club. This was the first time the club was sold to a non-founding entity.
In less than a year it was again sold to current owner Nick Skiadas.

In 2008, a major renovation took place in which the adjacent building was acquired and integrated into the existing facility. During that time, the stage lighting was overhauled to include low heat/power LED lighting, and the stage was enlarged to provide more area for touring bands.

A feature-length documentary film was made about the venue 

On September 4, 2020, the club's management announced that the downtown location would be closing. Although the article stated that a new venue would open in 2021, as of June they are only promoting events in other locations on their Facebook page.

Notable artist launches
 The band Live played the Chameleon Club early in their career. It is said that the band practiced in the club in their early days. (Interview with founder Rich Ruoff 2007)
 The Innocence Mission, a popular folk/rock band is from Lancaster, Pennsylvania and played many early shows at the Chameleon Club. (Interview with bass player Mike Bitts 2011)
 Suddenly, Tammy!
 The Ocean Blue
 FUEL
 August Burns Red whose original record label, C.I. Records resides next door in Lancaster, Pennsylvania got their start playing the Chameleon Club. (Interview with August Burns Red, 2009)
 Phish played there early in the life of the club. (1990-02-09)
 Gregg Allman and Dickie Betts informally kicked off their reunion here there (1985 or 1986).

References

External links
Official site

Buildings and structures in Lancaster, Pennsylvania